The modern states of Austria and Switzerland share a border with a length of  in two parts, separated by Liechtenstein, the longer stretch running across the Grison Alps and the shorter one following the Alpine Rhine to its mouth at Lake Constance.

History
The course of the border ultimately reflects the success of the various rivals of the House of Habsburg (most notably the Old Swiss Confederacy and the Three Leagues) in limiting the influence of the Habsburg Archdukes of Austria in the original Habsburg domains west of the Rhine in the 14th and 15th centuries. Most of the Alpine part of the border had already been the outer border of the Three Leagues since the 15th century (with the exception of the Vinschgau, which was acquired by Austria only in 1499 and remained disputed territory into the 18th century). By contrast, the Alpine Rhine Valley has a complicated feudal history (having been partly acquired by the Counts of Toggenburg during the 14th and 15th centuries), but the territories on its left bank had become subject territories of the Swiss Confederacy by the 17th century.

The current border is a product of the creation of the Helvetic Republic in 1798. During the 19th century it was part of the western border of the Austrian Empire and later Austria-Hungary, and in the 20th century of the First Austrian Republic, the Federal State of Austria, Nazi Germany and Allied-occupied Austria, and eventually of modern Austria since its formation in 1955. 
Liechtenstein was created as an independent principality under the Peace of Pressburg (1805), although it remained nominally a member of the Confederation of the Rhine until 1866.

Switzerland's accession to the Schengen Area in December 2008 removed all passport checks between the two countries. However, Swiss and Austrian customs officials retain a presence at well-frequented border crossings as they still have the authority to stop travellers to carry out customs checks, as Switzerland is outside the EU Customs Union.

Geography
As shown on the National Map of Switzerland, the Swiss-Austrian-Italian tripoint is north of Piz Lad, in the Engadin. The border follows the Inn River between Martina and Nauders and then runs west towards Samnaun. It cuts across the High Alps, connecting the peaks of Grübelekopf, Bürkelkopf, Greitspitz, Piz Rots, Fluchthorn, Augstenberg, Piz Buin and Gross Seehorn, roughly following the northern watershed of Engadin, and then to Isentällispitz and Schesaplana, along the northern watershed of Prättigau valley, meeting the southern tripoint of Switzerland, Austria and Liechtenstein at Naafkopf.

From the northern Swiss-Austrian-Liechtenstein tripoint, the Swiss-Austrian border follows the Alpine Rhine (which also forms the Swiss-Liechtenstein border), passing east of Diepoldsau and reaching Lake Constance at Rheineck; the Swiss-Austrian-German tripoint is within Lake Constance.

The ski areas Ischgl (of Austria) and Samnaun (of Switzerland) are connected on high altitude and form a combined cross-border ski area. Thanks to the Schengen Agreement it is without border control.

See also
France–Switzerland border
Germany–Switzerland border
Passes of the Silvretta and Rätikon Ranges
Central Eastern Alps
Rätikon
Silvretta Alps

References

 
European Union external borders
Borders of Austria
Borders of Switzerland
International borders